Ferdinando Gasparo Bertoni (15 August 1725 – 1 December 1813) was an Italian composer and organist.

Early years
He was born in Salò, and began his music studies in Brescia, not far from his birthplace. Around 1740 he went to Bologna, where he studied until 1745 with the famous music theorist Giovanni Battista Martini.

Career
Then he moved to Venice, where in 1752 he was appointed as first organist at San Marco.  From 1755 to 1777 he was choirmaster at the Ospedale dei Mendicanti, also in Venice. In the period 1778–1783 he was in London, where he composed operas for the King's Theatre. Back to Venice in 1784, he succeeded Baldassare Galuppi in 1785 as Kapellmeister of San Marco and preserved this position until his retirement in 1808.

Works
A prolific writer of church music, Bertoni also composed 70 operas which fell into oblivion, except Orfeo (Venice, Teatro San Benedetto, 1776), based on the same libretto by Ranieri de' Calzabigi for the work of Christoph Willibald Gluck, Orfeo ed Euridice (Burgtheater, Vienna, 1762). Bertoni composed this work especially for his friend Gaetano Guadagni, a castrato, who would interpret the role of Orfeo (the same role he had interpreted in Gluck’s Orfeo ed Euridice). Bertoni generally ignored Gluck's reforms and composed the work in the old style of opera seria.
Bertoni composed at least 200 sacred works (including about 50 oratorios) and cantatas, instrumental work and chamber music.

Death
He died in Desenzano del Garda.

Performances

Bampton Classical Opera performed his opera Orfeo ed Euridice in 2014, singing in English.

Recordings
 https://www.prestomusic.com/classical/works/206063--bertoni-f-addio-o-miei-sospiro-from-tancredi/browse

Orfeo ed Euridice
 https://www.gramophone.co.uk/review/bertoni-orfeo-ed-euridice
 https://www.prestomusic.com/classical/products/7955759--bertoni-f-orfeo
 https://www.classicstoday.com/review/review-14353/
 https://www.prestomusic.com/classical/products/8006849--vivaldi-stabat-mater
 Anna Starushkevych, the Ukrainian mezzo-soprano, explains how she prepares for a role, including (from about 7:40) her role in Bampton Classical Opera's production of Bertoni's Orfeo ed Euridice.

References

External links

1725 births
1813 deaths
Italian classical composers
Italian male classical composers
Italian classical organists
Male classical organists
Italian opera composers
Male opera composers
People from Salò
Cappella Marciana maestri